Tsai Ming-jung (born 23 January 1989) is a Taiwanese footballer who plays as a goalkeeper for the Chinese Taipei women's national team.

International career
Tsai Ming-jung represented Chinese Taipei at the 2007 AFC U-19 Women's Championship. She capped at senior level during the 2019 EAFF E-1 Football Championship and the 2020 AFC Women's Olympic Qualifying Tournament.

References

1989 births
Living people
Women's association football goalkeepers
Taiwanese women's footballers
Footballers from New Taipei
Chinese Taipei women's international footballers
Asian Games competitors for Chinese Taipei
Footballers at the 2014 Asian Games
Footballers at the 2018 Asian Games